Black Moon Chronicles is a 1999 video game by Cryo Interactive, based on the comic book series of the same name.

Plot 
The player is Wismerhill, a Half-Elf, who is stuck in the middle of a war between four camps.

Gameplay 
The gameplay draws both from the Warcraft and Heroes of Might and Magic series.

Critical reception 
According to Cryo Interactive, Black Moon Chronicles was a commercial success, with sales above 100,000 units by September 1999.

JeuxVideo thought the game brought originality to the real-time strategy genre, though thought its interface was too simple. Craig Vaughan of PC Zone negatively compared it to Magic and Mayhem and Warhammer: Dark Omen, though praised its gothic soundtrack. Mithnar of Polish review site Gry Online praised the "active pause" feature. Russian Michael Kalinchenko of Absolute Games hoped that adventure game company Cryo would stop making attempts at titles in the strategy genre.

References

External links
Official site

Cryo Interactive games
Strategy video games